The List of United Kingdom Speedway League Riders' Champions is the list of individual riders who have won the United Kingdom's League Riders' Championship that corresponded to the relevant league at the time. The list is split into three divisions, the top tier, the second tier and third tier, all three divisions have been known in various guises such as National League, Premier League, Elite League and many more. This list gives a complete listing of the winners for each season.

During some years there was only one or two divisions.

Riders' Championships (chronological order)

Tier One
British League Riders' Championship 1965–1994
Premier League Riders Championship 1995–1996
Elite League Riders' Championship 1997–2016
SGB Premiership Riders' Individual Championship 2017–present

Tier Two
Provincial League Riders' Championship 1960-1964
British League Division Two Riders Championship 1968-1994
Academy League Riders' Championship 1995
Conference League Riders' Individual Championship 1996
Premier League Riders Championship 1997–2016
SGB Championship Riders' Individual Championship 2009–present

Tier Three
British League Division Three Individual Championship 1994
Conference League Riders' Individual Championship 1997–2008
National League Riders' Championship 2009–present

List of Winners

References

Lists of motorsport champions
Speedway in the United Kingdom